The RTÉ Board is an eight-member body which makes policy and guiding corporate direction for RTÉ, Ireland's state public broadcaster.

History
The Board, then known as the RTÉ Authority, was established as the Radio Éireann Authority under the Broadcasting Authority Act 1960. The Authority is actually the legal entity known as Radio Teilifís Éireann and the body which has legal responsibility to run the services authorised under the Broadcasting Authority Acts 1960–2002. However, in reality actual management of the services is delegated to the Director-General and the staff of the Authority who together comprise RTÉ. The Authority met monthly and acted as RTÉ's board of directors, making general policy and overseeing the operations of RTÉ on a non-executive basis.

The RTÉ Authority was appointed by the Minister for Communications, Energy and Natural Resources. The RTÉ Executive reported to the Authority via the Director-General.

Under the Broadcasting Act 2009, the RTÉ Authority lost the "Authority" moniker and is simply referred to as the Board, and loses its self-regulatory function to the Broadcasting Authority of Ireland. The Board consists of 12 members - six nominated by the Minister, four nominated by the Minister on the advice of the Oireachtas Joint Committee with responsibility for broadcasting, one worker director and the Director-General.

A new Authority, the final authority, was appointed on 24 February 2009 on a six-month interim basis, until the 2008 Bill was enacted. The new Board of RTÉ and the four nominees of the Joint Committee with responsibility for broadcasting for the Broadcasting Authority of Ireland members will be appointed in early 2010 by the Minister for Communications, Energy and Natural Resources. The RTÉ Executive would now report to the board. 

In November 2022 Moya Doherty completed her term has Chair of RTÉ, Siún Ní Raghallaigh was appointed.

Current board members

References

Communications authorities
Organizations established in 2009
2009 establishments in Ireland
Board